Coraebastus is a genus of beetles in the family Buprestidae, containing the following species:

 Coraebastus imperatrix (Obenberger, 1931)
 Coraebastus quinquepustulatus Fairmaire, 1896

References

Buprestidae genera